Sidibé is a Fulani surname that may refer to:

 Bilal Sidibé (born 1978), Mauritanian football defender
 Djibril Sidibé (born 1982), Malian football midfielder
 Djibril Sidibé (born 1992), French football defender
 Issaka Sidibé (born 1946), Malian politician
 Julien Mory Sidibé (1927–2003), bishop of Mali
 Konimba Sidibe (born 1956), Malian politician
 Malick Sidibé (1935–2016), Malian photographer
 Mandé Sidibé (1940–2009), chairman of the board of directors of Ecobank
 Michel Sidibé (born 1952), Executive Director of UNAIDS and Under-Secretary-General of the United Nations
 Odiah Sidibé (born 1970), French sprint athlete
 Rafan Sidibé (born 1984), Malian football player
 Mamady Sidibé (born 1979), French-Malian footballer
 Sidibé Korian Sidibé, Deputy in the National Assembly of Mali
 Bakary Ebraheem Sidibe(h) (born 1986), Financial Manager, former Gambian Youth Soccer player

Given name
 Sidibé Aminata Diallo, Malian academic and politician

See also
 Gabourey Sidibe, American actress

Fula surnames